Splendrillia cruzensis is a species of sea snail, a marine gastropod mollusk in the family Drilliidae.

Description
The length of the shell varies between 10 mm and 13 mm.

Distribution
This marine species occurs off the Virgin Islands.

References

 Fallon P.J. (2016). Taxonomic review of tropical western Atlantic shallow water Drilliidae (Mollusca: Gastropoda: Conoidea) including descriptions of 100 new species. Zootaxa. 4090(1): 1–363

External links
 

cruzensis
Gastropods described in 2016